The Itoshiro Dam is a dam in the city of Ono in Fukui Prefecture, Japan.  It was completed in 1968.

References 

Dams in Fukui Prefecture
Dams completed in 1968